Kayro Flores Heatley (born 1 April 1998) is an Italian footballer who plays for Atletico Fiuggi.

Career

Measuring 184 cm tall, Flores was part of the Lazio youth program before switching to the Nike Academy until January 2016 when he was spotted by Lupa Castelli Roma who signed him.

Wearing the colors of Serie D club Nuorese Calcio in 2017, the Nicaraguan featured 9 times there, moving to Südtirol after a few months.

On 12 August 2018 he signed with Serie C club Cavese.

On 23 August 2019, he moved to Arzignano on a 2-year contract.

On 8 August 2020 he signed a one-year contract with an extension option with Piacenza.

On 19 January 2021 he joined Fano.

On 2 November 2021 he moved to Atletico Fiuggi in Serie D.

Personal life
Flores is of a heterogeneous family background. He was born in Rome Italy. His father, Kayro Flores Senior is Nicaraguan, his mother, Christine Heatley is English, and his grandfather was Costa Rican. Kayro Junior, due to his mix of cultures and nationalities (British, Nicaraguan, Costa Rican and Italian) is eligible to represent internationally  either one of these countries according to FIFA rules.

References

1998 births
Living people
Footballers from Rome
Italian footballers
Italian people of Costa Rican descent
Italian people of English descent
Italian people of Nicaraguan descent
Association football forwards
Serie D players
Serie C players
S.S. Racing Club Roma players
Nuorese Calcio players
F.C. Südtirol players
Cavese 1919 players
Piacenza Calcio 1919 players
Alma Juventus Fano 1906 players
A.S.D. Atletico Terme Fiuggi players